Smoky Hill City is a ghost town in Ellis County, Kansas, United States.

History
The land was bought by Charles K. Holliday of Topeka, and a townsite plat was filed with the county in 1899.  Charles Holliday was the son of railroad magnate Cyrus K. Holliday and both father and son believed that the area contained valuable mineral deposits.  The town was situated on the north bank of the Smoky Hill River to serve the gold mines that Charles Holliday imagined would spring up to mine the supposed gold-bearing shale along the Smoky Hill River valley.

Holliday began selling town lots.  Some of the first residents came from the town of Chetolah, just a few miles down the Smoky Hill River. Chetolah had been founded ten years earlier in the anticipation of a railroad connection that was never built.  With the influential Hollidays backing the new town of Smoky Hill City, residents of Chetolah deserted to the new town.

The idea that the shales of along the Smoky Hill River contained valuable minerals started in the mid-19th century as a swindle by Native Americans who said that they knew of tin mines along the Smoky Hill.  In the 1890s, prospectors imagined that they found zinc in the shale of Ellis and adjacent Trego County, and then believed that they found gold.  The delusion was abetted by unscrupulous assayers, and by swindlers selling secret metallurgical processes to extract gold from the shale.  Vigorously warning against the gold delusion was Kansas state geologist Erasmus Haworth, even though the influential promoters threatened to have him fired for his opposition.  The Ellis County gold boom sputtered along from 1895 to 1903, by which time (almost) everyone realized that there was no recoverable gold in the shale.

The designation of Smoky Hill City as a townsite was vacated by Ellis County in 1905, at the request of Charles Holliday.  The settlement survived for several more years, but was eventually completely abandoned.

Geography

See also
 Chetolah, Kansas

References

Further reading

External links
 The Imaginary Gold Mines of Kansas
 Ellis County maps: Current, Historic, KDOT

Former populated places in Ellis County, Kansas